The EAR 56 class was a class of  gauge  Garratt-type articulated steam locomotives built by Beyer, Peacock & Co. in Gorton, Manchester, England, in 1949.  The six members of the class were ordered by the Kenya-Uganda Railway (KUR) immediately after World War II, and were a slightly modified version of the KUR's existing EC5 class.

By the time the new locomotives were built and entered service, the KUR had been succeeded by the East African Railways (EAR), which designated them for a very short time as its EC6 class, but then, as part of a comprehensive reclassification of all of its locomotives, redesignated them as its 56 class.

Class list
The builder's and fleet numbers of each member of the class were as follows:

See also
Rail transport in Kenya
Rail transport in Tanzania
Rail transport in Uganda

References

Notes

Bibliography

External links

Beyer, Peacock locomotives
East African Railways locomotives
Garratt locomotives
Metre gauge steam locomotives
Railway locomotives introduced in 1949
Steam locomotives of Kenya
Steam locomotives of Uganda
4-8-2+2-8-4 locomotives